The Expedition to Mostaganem of 1543 was a failed expedition against the Algerian city of Mostaganem by the Spanish forces of Count Alcaudete.

The Spanish forces of Count Alcaudete numbering between 5,000 to 7,000 men led an expedition against Mostaganem in 1543. The attempt to seize the city failed and the army of Count Alcaudete was defeated, the road from Mostaganem to Oran was covered with Spanish corpses. Another expedition was mounted against Mostaganem in 1547 but this expedition was also defeated.

See also
Expedition to Mostaganem (1547)
Expedition to Mostaganem (1558)

References 

16th century in Algeria
Battles involving Algeria
Battles involving Spain
1543 in Spain